Swarup Singh  or Swaroop Singh may refer to:

Swarup Singh Karki, Dewan (Prime Minister) of Kingdom of Nepal
Swarup Singh of Jind (1812–1864), Sikh Raja of Jind of the Phulkian dynasty who reigned from 1834 to 1864.
Swarup Singh of Gingee, the fort commander of Gingee Fort from 1700 until his death in 1714
Swarup Singh of Udaipur (1815–1861), the Maharana of Udaipur State 
Sarup Singh (1917–2003) also known as also Swaroop Singh, an Indian academic turned politician
Sarup Singh (Haryana Vidhan Sabha Speaker) (1919–2009), former Haryana Vidhan Sabha speaker
Ram Swaroop Singh, an Indian politician and a former member of Uttar Pradesh Legislative Assembly